Jonathan Simon Christopher Riley-Smith  (27 June 1938 – 13 September 2016) was a historian of the Crusades, and, between 1994 and 2005, Dixie Professor of Ecclesiastical History at Cambridge. He was a Fellow of Emmanuel College, Cambridge.

Provenance and early life
Riley-Smith was the eldest of four children born into a prosperous Yorkshire brewing family. His maternal grandfather (to whose memory he later dedicated his book What Were the Crusades?) was the British Conservative Party MP, John Craik-Henderson (1890-1971).

He attended Eton College and Trinity College, Cambridge, where he took his BA (1960), MA (1964), PhD (1964), and LittD (2001).

Academic career
Riley-Smith taught at the University of St Andrews (1964–1972), Queens' College, Cambridge (1972-1978), Royal Holloway College, London (1978–1994) as well as at Emmanuel (1994–2005). His many respected publications on the origins of the crusading movement and the motivations of the first crusaders have deeply influenced current historiography of the crusades: in an appreciative obituary, a senior colleague described Riley-Smith as "quite simply the leading historian of the crusades anywhere in the world".

He was appointed a Knight of Grace and Devotion of the Sovereign Military Order of Malta and a Bailiff Grand Cross of the Most Venerable Order of the Hospital of Saint John of Jerusalem.

Riley-Smith appeared in the documentary series Crusades (1995) as an historical authority. However, the series adopted the by then outdated views of Steven Runciman, which were not held by the interviewed experts. Then the producers edited the taped interviews so that the historians seemed to be agreeing with Runciman. Riley-Smith said of the producers, "they made me appear to say things that I do not believe!"

Personal life
Riley-Smith was a convert to Catholicism. He married Louise Field, a portrait artist, in 1968. Their three children include the singer/songwriter Polly Paulusma.

Jonathan Riley-Smith died on 13 September 2016.

Bibliography

The Knights of St John in Jerusalem and Cyprus, c. 1050–1310 (London, Macmillan, 1967, reprinted 2002)

 
The Feudal Nobility and the Kingdom of Jerusalem, 1174–1277 (London, Macmillan, 1973, reprinted 2002)
What Were the Crusades? (London, Macmillan, 1977, 2nd edition 1992, 3rd edition Basingstoke, Palgrave, 2002)
The Crusades: Idea and Reality, 1095–1274, with Louise Riley-Smith (London, Edward Arnold, 1981)
The First Crusade and the Idea of Crusading (London and Philadelphia, Athlone/ University of Pennsylvania Press, 1986, paperback US 1990, UK 1993)
The Crusades: A Short History (London and New Haven, Athlone/ Yale University Press, 1987, also in paperback, translated into French, Italian and Polish)
The Atlas of the Crusades (editor) (London and New York, Times Books/ Facts on File, 1991, translated into German and French)
The Oxford Illustrated History of the Crusades, editor (Oxford, Oxford University Press, 1995, paperback 1997, now reissued as The Oxford History of the Crusades, paperback, 1999, translated into Russian, German and Polish)
Cyprus and the Crusades, editor, with Nicholas Coureas) (Nicosia, Society for the Study of the Crusades and the Latin East and Cyprus Research Centre, 1995)
Montjoie: Studies in Crusade History in Honour of Hans Eberhard Mayer, editor, with Benjamin Z. Kedar and Rudolf Hiestand (Aldershot, Variorum, 1997)
The First Crusaders, 1095–1131 (Cambridge, Cambridge University Press, 1997, paperback 1998 and 2000)
Hospitallers: The History of the Order of St. John (London, The Hambledon Press, 1999, also in paperback, translated into Russian)
Al seguito delle Crociate Rome (Di Renzo: Dialoghi Uomo e Societΰ, 2000)
Dei gesta per Francos: Etudes sur les croisades dιdiιes ΰ Jean Richard, editor, with M. Balard and B.Z. Kedar (Aldershot (Ashgate), 2001)
The Crusades, Christianity, and Islam (Columbia University Press, 2008)
The Knights Hospitaller in the Levant 1070–1309 (Basingstoke, 2012)

References

External links
Obituary, The Daily Telegraph, 22 September 2016

1938 births
2016 deaths
English Christians
English Roman Catholics
Fellows of Queens' College, Cambridge
English historians
Alumni of Trinity College, Cambridge
Bailiffs Grand Cross of the Order of St John
Fellows of Emmanuel College, Cambridge
Fellows of the Royal Historical Society
Historians of the Crusades
People educated at Eton College
People from Harrogate
Dixie Professors of Ecclesiastical History
Converts to Roman Catholicism
Place of death missing
Corresponding Fellows of the Medieval Academy of America